Juken New Zealand, formerly known as Juken Nissho is a Japanese-owned forestry company operating in New Zealand.

The company
Juken Nissho was formed for the 1990 purchase of licences to run previously publicly owned forests covering nearly 600 km² of Northland, the Wairarapa and East Cape. It operates plants at Kaitaia, Masterton and Gisborne and employs around 1,000 New Zealanders largely as labourers.

At present Juken Nissho controls around 550 km² of Pinus radiata, Douglas-fir and Corsican pine.  Juken New Zealand manufactures and markets timber panel products under the Triboard, Spaceboard and Strandboard brands. Triboard, conceived in the 1980s, competes with older technologies such as particleboard and MDF.

Criticism
Juken Nissho states it has invested over $700 million New Zealand dollars in the country, but has attracted criticism from unions and the political left for alleged pollution, for disregard of employees and for the funding arrangement by which the investment was made, (it was alleged the Japanese investors founded a limited liability company to buy New Zealand assets using the assets as the only security, without committing any capital or taking on any risk). Juken Nissho was successfully prosecuted by the Northland Regional Council for discharge of contaminants into air in 1998 and won the Roger Award for The Worst Transnational Corporation in New Zealand in 2003, however has since significantly reduced emissions, increased safety and made major efforts to become more environmentally friendly.
Juken has also had 20 health and safety convictions over the last two decades and has been sentenced again (2019) at the Kaitaia District Court, following an incident which saw a worker suffer serious steam burns.  The previous incident in July 2017, also involved a steam related injury when a worker, who was replacing a heat probe inside an enclosed Triboard manufacturing press, was engulfed in hot steam.

Notes

External links
 Juken Nissho Ltd website
 Juken Nissho Ltd - company profile
 Roger Award story

Forest products companies of New Zealand
Renewable resource companies established in 1990